Nordica may refer to:

Companies 

 Nordica (airline), an Estonian airline
 Nordica (company), a manufacturer of skis, ski boots, and accessories for skiing

People 

 Lillian Nordica, an American operatic soprano

Ships and boats 

 
 MS Stena Nordica, the name of various Stena Line ships, including:
 MS Stena Nordica (2004), built in 2000 as the MS European Ambassador
 MS Regina Pacis, built 1979, named Stena Nordica from 1988 to 1996
Nordica 16, a sailboat design from 1820
 , a Liberty ship launched 1944, scrapped 1965, named after the soprano

See also